Strategic thinking is a mental or thinking process applied by an individual in the context of achieving a goal or set of goals. As a cognitive activity, it produces thought.

When applied in an organizational strategic management process, strategic thinking involves the generation and application of unique business insights and opportunities intended to create competitive advantage for a firm or organization. It can be done individually, as well as collaboratively among key people who can positively alter an organization's future. Group strategic thinking may create more value by enabling a proactive and creative dialogue, where individuals gain other people's perspectives on critical and complex issues. This is regarded as a benefit in highly competitive and fast-changing business landscapes.

Overview
There is a generally accepted definition for strategic thinking, a common agreement as to its role or importance, and a standardised list of key competencies of strategic thinkers. There is also a consensus on whether strategic thinking is an uncommon ideal or a common and observable property of strategy. It includes finding and developing a strategic foresight capacity for an organization, by exploring all possible organizational futures, and challenging conventional thinking to foster decision making today. Research on strategic thought indicates that the critical strategic question is not the conventional "What?", but "Why?" or "How?". The work of Henry Mintzberg and other authors, further support the conclusion; and also draw a clear distinction between strategic thinking and strategic planning, another important strategic management thought process.

General Andre Beaufre wrote in 1963 that strategic thinking "is a mental process, at once abstract and rational, which must be capable of synthesizing both psychological and material data.  The strategist must have a great capacity for both analysis and synthesis; analysis is necessary to assemble the data on which he makes his diagnosis, synthesis in order to produce from these data the diagnosis itself—and the diagnosis in fact amounts to a choice between alternative courses of action."

Most agree that traditional models of strategy making, which are primarily based on strategic planning, are not working. Strategy in today's competitive business landscape is moving away from the basic ‘strategic planning’ to more of ‘strategic thinking’ in order to remain competitive. However, both thought processes must work hand-in-hand in order to reap maximum benefit. It has been argued that the real heart of strategy is the 'strategist'; and for a better strategy execution requires a strategic thinker who can discover novel, imaginative strategies which can re-write the rules of the competitive game; and set in motion the chain of events that will shape and "define the future".

There are many tools and techniques to promote and discipline strategic thinking. The flowchart to the right provides a process for classifying a phenomenon as a scenario in the intuitive logics tradition, and how it differs from a number of other planning approaches.

Strategic thinking vs. strategic planning 
In the view of F. Graetz, strategic thinking and planning are “distinct, but interrelated and complementary thought processes” that must sustain and support one another for effective strategic management. Graetz's model holds that the role of strategic thinking is "to seek innovation and imagine new and very different futures that may lead the company to redefine its core strategies and even its industry". Strategic planning's role is "to realise and to support strategies developed through the strategic thinking process and to integrate these back into the business".

Henry Mintzberg wrote in 1994 that strategic thinking is more about synthesis (i.e., "connecting the dots") than analysis (i.e., "finding the dots"). It is about "capturing what the manager learns from all sources (both the soft insights from his or her personal experiences and the experiences of others throughout the organization and the hard data from market research and the like) and then synthesizing that learning into a vision of the direction that the business should pursue." Mintzberg argued that strategic thinking cannot be systematized and is the critical part of strategy formation, as opposed to strategic planning exercises. In his view, strategic planning happens around the strategy formation or strategic thinking activity, by providing inputs for the strategist to consider and providing plans for controlling the implementation of the strategy after it is formed.

According to Jeanne Liedtka, strategic thinking differs from strategic planning along the following dimensions of strategic management:

Strategic thinking competencies 
Liedtka observed five “major attributes of strategic thinking in practice” that resemble competencies:
 Systems perspective, refers to being able to understand implications of strategic actions. "A strategic thinker has a mental model of the complete end-to-end system of value creation, his or her role within it, and an understanding of the competencies it contains."
 Intent focused which means more determined and less distractible than rivals in the marketplace. Crediting Hamel and Prahalad with popularising the concept, Liedtka describes strategic intent as "the focus that allows individuals within an organization to marshal and leverage their energy, to focus attention, to resist distraction, and to concentrate for as long as it takes to achieve a goal."
 Thinking in time means being able to hold past, present and future in mind at the same time to create better decision making and speed implementation. "Strategy is not driven by future intent alone. It is the gap between today’s reality and intent for the future that is critical." Scenario planning is a practical application for incorporating "thinking in time" into strategy making.
 Hypothesis driven, ensuring that both creative and critical thinking are incorporated into strategy making. This competency explicitly incorporates the scientific method into strategic thinking.
 Intelligent opportunism, which means being responsive to good opportunities. "The dilemma involved in using a well-articulated strategy to channel organisational efforts effectively and efficiently must always be balanced against the risks of losing sight of alternative strategies better suited to a changing environment."

See also
 U.S. Army Strategist

References

External links
 What is strategic thinking?, harvardbusiness.org
 6 Habits of True Strategic Thinkers by Paul J. H. Schoemaker, Inc.com
 For Great Leadership, Clear Your Head by Joshua Ehrlich, Harvard Business Review
 How to Think Strategically by Michael Watkins, Harvard Business Review
 Strategic Thinking: Success Secrets of Big Business Projects  Dr David Stevens, McGraw Hill, 1997
 Strategy Execution – Ensure your culture provides for common sense by i-nexus

Strategic management
Business planning
Business terms
Strategy